The 1992–93 season was the 96th season of competitive football in Scotland.

Notable events

Rangers completing a domestic treble of the Premier Division title, Scottish Cup and League Cup.
The return of Celtic striker Frank McAvennie to the club from Aston Villa in January, four years after he left them for a second spell at West Ham United.
Celtic's £1.5million pre-season move for West Ham United winger Stuart Slater.
The pre-season sale of Rangers striker Paul Rideout to Everton for £500,000.
Trevor Steven returning to Rangers at the start of the season after a year in France with Marseille, costing them a Scottish record fee of £2.4million – though less than half the £5.5million they had received for him in August 1991.
Striker Duncan Shearer, who had played in England since 1983, finally played professional football in his homeland at the age of 30 after joining Aberdeen from Blackburn Rovers for £500,000.
Rangers progressing to the group stage of the European Cup, eliminating English league champions Leeds United in the second knockout stage.
Aidrieonians going into the European Cup Winners' Cup, having entered as the previous season's losing Scottish Cup finalists to league champions Rangers, ended the season relegated from the Premier Division.
Jim McLean's final season as manager of Dundee United, bringing to an end his 22-year reign.

Scottish Premier Division

Champions: Rangers
Relegated: Falkirk, Airdrieonians

Scottish League Division One

Promoted: Raith Rovers, Kilmarnock
Relegated: Meadowbank Thistle, Cowdenbeath

Scottish League Division Two

Promoted: Clyde, Brechin City

Other honours

Cup honours

Individual honours

SPFA awards

SFWA awards

Scottish clubs in Europe

Average coefficient – 4.800

Scotland national team

Key:
(H) = Home match
(A) = Away match
WCQG1 = World Cup qualifying – Group 1

See also
1992–93 Dundee United F.C. season
1992–93 Rangers F.C. season
1992–93 Aberdeen F.C. season

Notes and references

 
Seasons in Scottish football